Brian Morgan (1950–2007) was a Canadian lawyer, born in Lethbridge, Alberta to Frederick and Audrey Morgan (née Boyd).  He attended the University of Trinity College and later the University of Oxford as a Rhodes Scholar.  He served as a law clerk for Mr. Justice Brian Dickson.  He argued the first case heard in the Supreme Court of Canada after the passing of the Charter of Rights and Freedoms.

External links
Obituary in the Globe and Mail

Oral history interview of Brian Morgan regarding his involvement in student government held at the University of Toronto Archives and Records Management Services.

1950 births
2007 deaths
Trinity College (Canada) alumni
University of Toronto alumni
20th-century Canadian lawyers